Heinz Sauer (born December 25, 1932, Merseburg) is a German jazz saxophonist.

Sauer was an autodidact on tenor saxophone and began his career playing locally around Frankfurt in the 1950s. He played for many years in Albert Mangelsdorff's ensemble, as well as the Jazzensemble des Hessischen Rundfunks and the German All Stars. He worked often with Bob Degen, and has also performed or recorded with musicians such as Ralf Hübner, Günter Lenz, Stefan Schmolck, and Manfred Schoof. In the 1990s he began experimenting with the use of electronic processing on his saxophones. In the 2000s among others he performed in a trio with Christopher Dell (vibraphones) and Bertram Ritter (percussion) and a duo with Michael Wollny.
He received several prestigious German awards such as "Deutscher Jazzpreis" (1999),  "SWR-Jazzpreis" (2008) and several times the "Deutscher Schallplattenpreis"("German Record Critics' Award").

Discography
 Ellingtonia Revisited! (L+R, 1980)
 Blues After Sunrise (L+R, 1983)
 Melancholia (ACT, 2005)
 Certain Beauty (ACT, 2006)
 The Journey (ACT, 2008)
 If (Blue) Then (Blue) (ACT, 2010)
 Plaza Lost and Found (L+R, 2012)
 Don't Explain (ACT, 2012)
 Hamburg Episode (Art of Groove, 2015)
 Europaischer Jazz 2016 (Infraserv Hochst, 2016)

References
Wolfram Knauer, "Heinz Sauer". The New Grove Dictionary of Jazz, 2nd edition, ed. Barry Kernfeld.

1932 births
Living people
German jazz saxophonists
Male saxophonists
21st-century saxophonists
21st-century German male musicians
German male jazz musicians
Globe Unity Orchestra members
ACT Music artists